Joseph Francis Leeson Jr. (born April 15, 1955) is a United States district judge of the United States District Court for the Eastern District of Pennsylvania.

Early life and education

Leeson was born April 15, 1955, in Allentown, Pennsylvania and received a Bachelor of Arts degree, cum laude, in 1977 from DeSales University in Center Valley, Pennsylvania. He received a Juris Doctor in 1980 from the Catholic University of America Columbus School of Law.

Career
Upon graduation from law school, he became a founding partner of the law firm of Leeson, Leeson & Leeson in Bethlehem, Pennsylvania. The firm conducted a general civil practice with an emphasis on litigation. Leeson earned certification as a civil trial advocate from the National Board of Trial Advocacy and also served as an arbitrator for the American Arbitration Association. During his career, he served as a solicitor for several municipalities in Pennsylvania. In 2017 he was awarded an honorary Doctor of Law degree by DeSales University.

Leeson previously held elected public office as a member of the city council in Bethlehem, where he served as vice president and chair of the finance committee. He also was elected as a member of the Northampton County Government Study Commission where he co-authored the Home Rule Charter for Northampton County.

He has served as chair of the boards of the Lehigh Valley Public Telecommunications Corporation, PBS 39, the Lehigh Valley Community Foundation, the Lehigh–Northampton Airport Authority, and the Janet Johnston Housenick and William D. Housenick Memorial Foundation. He formerly served as a member of the board of commissioners of the Pennsylvania Public Television Network.

Federal judge
On June 16, 2014, President Barack Obama nominated Leeson to serve as a United States District Judge of the United States District Court for the Eastern District of Pennsylvania to the seat vacated by Judge Eduardo C. Robreno, who assumed senior status on August 31, 2013. On July 24, 2014 a hearing before the United States Senate Committee on the Judiciary was held on his nomination. On September 18, 2014 his nomination was reported out of committee by a voice vote. On December 3, 2014 Senate Majority Leader Harry Reid filed for cloture on his nomination. On December 4, 2014, the Senate voted 66–26 to invoke cloture on Leeson's nomination.  Later that same day, the Senate voted 76–16 to confirm Leeson. He received his federal judicial commission on December 5, 2014.

References

External links

1955 births
Living people
Columbus School of Law alumni
DeSales University alumni
Judges of the United States District Court for the Eastern District of Pennsylvania
Pennsylvania lawyers
People from Allentown, Pennsylvania
United States district court judges appointed by Barack Obama
21st-century American judges